Pasaband District is located in Ghor province, Afghanistan. The population is 92,900 (11% Pashtun, 5% Hazara and 84% Tajik). Located in the southern part of Ghor province, Pasaband District borders Helmand province to the south, Daykundi province to the east, and Farah province to the southwest. The district center is Shinkot.

Pasaband is a mountainous district where winters are long and  severe. Roads are not in good condition and some villages are accessible only using animals. Because of the inaccessibility of villages and the few wells, the people's access to clean water is a major problem. Agriculture is the main source of income and it is seriously affected by drought. The health and education need improvement.

Economy 
The district suffers from a weak economy due to lack of access to basic health, social and
infrastructure services, low agricultural and livestock production levels and quality, and weak
performance of local government administrations.
 Agricultural: wheat, barley, maize, onion, carrot and turnips.
 Handicrafts: carpet and rug weaving, tailoring and embroidery.

References

External links 
 District Profile UNHCR, September 2002
 Map of Settlements  AIMS, September 2011

Districts of Ghor Province